Enteromius trispilomimus is a species of ray-finned fish in the genus Enteromius which occurs in coastal rivers from Cameroon to the Chiloango River on the border between the Angolan exclave of Cabinda and the Democratic republic of the Congo.

References 

 

Enteromius
Taxa named by George Albert Boulenger
Fish described in 1907